Frank Lewis Prescott (1878-1956) was a member of the Wisconsin State Assembly.

Biography
Prescott was born on October 27, 1878 in Milwaukee, Wisconsin. He would become involved in advertising and publishing. Prescott died on December 12, 1956, in Honolulu, Hawaii where he had been living since 1952.

Political career
Prescott was elected to the Assembly in 1915, 1920, 1922, and 1924. He was a Republican.

References

Politicians from Milwaukee
Businesspeople from Milwaukee
Republican Party members of the Wisconsin State Assembly
1878 births
1956 deaths